Elaphonematidae is a family of nematodes belonging to the order Rhabditida.

Genera:
 Elaphonema Heyns, 1962

References

Nematode families